The Poltava Regiment was one of ten territorial-administrative subdivisions of the Cossack Hetmanate. The regiment's capital was the city of Poltava, now in Poltava Oblast of central Ukraine.

The Poltava Regiment was founded in 1648 during the Khmelnytsky Uprising. Following the signing of the Treaty of Zboriv in 1649 it consisted of 19 sotnias, and had 2970 registered cossacks. In 1775, the regiment was officially abolished, and its territory was reformed into the Little Russia Governorate.

References

 Zaruba V.M. Administratyvno-terytorialnyj ustrij ta administraciya Vijska Zaporozkoho u 1648-1782 rr., Dnipropetrovsk, 2007
 Горобець В. Історія українського козацтва//Полково-сотенний устрій Гетьманату. Нариси у 2-х томах.
 В. О. Мокляк. Джерела з історії Полтавського полку. Середина XVII–XVIII ст. Т. І: Компути та ревізії Полтавського полку. Компут 1649 р. Компут 1718 р. Полтава: АСМІ 2007

Cossack Hetmanate Regiments
History of Poltava Oblast
1649 establishments in the Polish–Lithuanian Commonwealth
Military units and formations established in 1649